Mary Mary is an American reality television series that aired on WE tv from March 29, 2012, to November 2, 2017. The series follows the daily lives of sisters and musicians, Erica and Tina Campbell, as they balance their households and careers.

Episodes

Season 1 (2012)

Season 2 (2012–13)

Season 3 (2014)

Season 4 (2015)

Season 5 (2016)

Season 6 (2017)

International airings
Mary Mary began airing on The Africa Channel in Europe and Asia from July 19, 2013.

References

2010s American documentary television series
2012 American television series debuts
2017 American television series endings
Television series based on singers and musicians
Television shows set in Los Angeles
English-language television shows
Television series by Entertainment One
Mary Mary